Alexander Sinclair (29 January 1882 – 25 August 1962) was an Australian rules footballer who played for the St Kilda Football Club in the Victorian Football League (VFL).

References

External links 

1882 births
1933 deaths
Australian rules footballers from Victoria (Australia)
St Kilda Football Club players
Beaufort Football Club players